The Jama Masjid of Bijapur (also known as Jamiya Masjid or Jumma Masjid) is a congregational mosque in the Indian state of Karnataka. Initiated by Ali Adil Shah I of the Bijapur Sultanate in the 16th century, the mosque was never completed. It is the largest mosque in Bijapur, and has a capacity of 4000 worshippers. 

The building was put by UNESCO on its "tentative list" to become a World Heritage Site in 2014, with others in the region, under the name Monuments and Forts of the Deccan Sultanate (despite there being a number of different sultanates).

History 
The construction of the Jama Masjid was begun by Ali Adil Shah I in the year 1576. The project was financed with money looted from the Battle of Talikota, in which an alliance of Deccan Sultanates had emerged victorious against the Vijayanagara Empire.  Though the majority of the mosque was constructed by 1686, the structure never reached completion. It nonetheless came to serve as the principal mosque of Bijapur, replacing an older, smaller congregational mosque built by Ibrahim Adil Shah I.  

Later rulers made some augmentations to the mosque. The addition of murals near the mosque's central mihrab was probably made by Muhammad Adil Shah. Mughal Emperor Aurangzeb added an eastern doorway to the mosque, and made modifications to the prayer hall's flooring.

Architecture 
The Jama Masjid is the largest mosque in the city of Bijapur, with a capacity of 4000 worshippers. It is considered one of the finest examples of Adil Shahi architecture. Bianca Alfieri comments that the mosque draws elements from previous Bahmanid architecture. Additionally, Richard Eaton notes that the mosque is emblematic of Iranian influence, and does not incorporate local traditions to the extent of later Bijapuri architecture. The design and ornamentation of the mosque are quite simple; ArchNet explains this as a consequence of Ali Adil Shah's Shiism, since followers of the sect typically preferred less decoration in places of worship.

Structure 
The rectangular mosque complex spreads over 5040 m2, and is enclosed by perimeter walls. The main entrance to the complex is the eastern gate. Within the complex is a square sahn (courtyard) of side length 50 m, containing fountains and an ablution reservoir.

The main prayer hall, measuring 70 by 36 m, is situated on the west end of the complex. It is topped with a hemispherical dome, bearing a crescent-moon finial and surrounded by a balustrade at the base. The facade of the prayer hall features seven arched openings, of which the central one alone is decorated. 

Supported by piers, the interior of the prayer hall is divided into five bays, running parallel to the western qibla wall. The interior emphasises clean lines over excessive embellishment; only minimal plaster-work is observed. Its floor is divided into 2250 rectangular boxes, resembling a prayer mat, though this was a later addition by Aurangzeb. 

The generally minimal and austere nature of the interior is interrupted by heavy mural ornamentation surrounding the central mihrab, on the qibla wall. Gilded and decorated in blue, black and gold, the mihrab features varied imagery, and is dominated by Quranic epigraphy. The ornamentation is probably a later addition under Muhammad Adil Shah, attested by some Persian inscriptions near the mihrab. Unlike Ali, Muhammad Adil Shah was a Sunni, and this may be responsible for the stark aesthetic difference between the mosque and its mihrab. Its luxurious decoration has led Michell and Zebrowski to regard it as one of the finest in the Islamic world; they compare it to the mihrab of the Mosque–Cathedral in Córdoba.

Incomplete features 
The mosque features corner buttressing on the eastern facade, indicating an unfulfilled intention to construct two minarets there. Additionally, merlons are absent from the parapets of the galleries surrounding the courtyard.

Gallery

References

External links 

Mosques in Karnataka
Buildings and structures in Bijapur district
1578 establishments in Asia
Religious buildings and structures completed in 1578
Bijapur